Prenderol (Diethylpropanediol) is a simple alkyl diol which has sedative, anticonvulsant and muscle relaxant effects. It is closely related in structure to meprobamate and numerous other alkyl alcohols and diols with generally comparable activity.

See also
 1,4-Butanediol
 1,6-Dioxecane-2,7-dione
 1-Ethynylcyclohexanol
 2-Methyl-2-propyl-1,3-propanediol
 2-Methyl-2-butanol
 2-Methyl-2-pentanol
 3-Methyl-3-pentanol
 3-Hydroxybutanal
 Ethchlorvynol
 Phenaglycodol

References

Alkanediols
Muscle relaxants